Angela Jackson (born July 25, 1951) is an American poet, playwright, and novelist based in Chicago, Illinois. Jackson became the Illinois Poet Laureate in 2020.

Biography
Angela Jackson was born in Greenville, Mississippi, the fifth of nine children, but grew up on the South Side of Chicago, where her father, George Jackson, Sr, and mother, Angeline Robinson Jackson, moved.

Jackson lives and works in Chicago, Illinois.

Education
In 1977, she graduated from Northwestern University, where she won an Academy of American Poets Award, and the University of Chicago with an M.A. in Latin American and Caribbean studies. Her novels Where I Must Go and Roads, Where There Are No Roads were inspired by her experiences at Northwestern.

Career
She joined the Organization of Black American Culture (OBAC) with young black writers such as Haki Madhubuti (Don L. Lee), Carolyn Rodgers, Sterling Plumpp, and was editor of the journal Nommo.

Personal life 
Jackson is Catholic.

Awards
 1973: Conrad Kent Rivers Memorial Award
 1974: Academy of American Poets Award from Northwestern University
 1979: Illinois Art Council Creative Writing Fellowship in Fiction
 1980: National Endowment For the Arts Creative Writing Fellowship in Fiction
 1984: Hoyt W. Fuller Award for Literary Excellence
 1985: American Book Award
 1984: DuSable Museum Writers Seminar Poetry Prize
 1984: Pushcart Prize for Poetry
 1989: ETA Gala Award
 1996: Illinois Authors Literary Heritage Award
 Illinois Arts Council Literary Awards
 five for fiction and one for poetry; The Carl Sandburg Award
 Chicago Sun-Times Friends of Literature Book of the Year Award
 2000: Illinois Art Council Creative Writing Fellowship in Playwriting
 2002: Shelley Memorial Award of the Poetry Society of America
 2008: American Book Award

Works

Poetry
 "VooDoo/Love Magic", Poetry Foundation
 
 The Greenville Club, 1977 (chapbook)

Plays
 Witness!, 1970
 Shango Diaspora: An African American Myth of Womanhood and Love, 1980
  Also known as When the Wind Blows
 Lightfoot: The Crystal Stair

Novels
 Treemont Stone
  American Book Award

Memoir
 Apprenticeship in the House of Cowrie Shells

Anthologies

References

External links
 Angela Jackson Bio from Illinois Poet Laureate
 

1951 births
Living people
Northwestern University alumni
University of Chicago alumni
People from Greenville, Mississippi
Poets from Illinois
Poets Laureate of Illinois
20th-century American dramatists and playwrights
21st-century American novelists
American women novelists
20th-century American women writers
American Book Award winners
Novelists from Illinois
African-American Catholics
21st-century American women writers
20th-century African-American women writers
20th-century African-American writers
21st-century African-American women writers
21st-century African-American writers